In mathematics, the doubly triangular numbers are the numbers that appear within the sequence of triangular numbers, in positions that are also triangular numbers. That is, if  denotes the th triangular number, then the doubly triangular numbers are the numbers of the form .

Sequence and formula
The doubly triangular numbers form the sequence
0, 1, 6, 21, 55, 120, 231, 406, 666, 1035, 1540, 2211, ... 

The th doubly triangular number is given by the quartic formula

The sums of row sums of Floyd's triangle give the doubly triangular numbers.
Another way of expressing this fact is that the sum of all of the numbers in the first  rows of Floyd's triangle is the th doubly triangular number.

In combinatorial enumeration
An example from mathematical chemistry is given by the numbers of overlap integrals between Slater-type orbitals.
Another example of this phenomenon from combinatorics is that the doubly-triangular numbers count the number of two-edge undirected multigraphs on  labeled vertices. In this setting, an edge is an unordered pair of vertices, and a two-edge graph is an unordered pair of edges. The number of possible edges is a triangular number, and the number of pairs of edges (allowing both edges to connect the same two vertices) is a doubly triangular number.
In the same way, the doubly triangular numbers also count the number of distinct ways of coloring the four corners or the four edges of a square with  colors, allowing some colors to be unused and counting two colorings as being the same when they differ from each other only by rotation or reflection of the square. The number of choices of colors for any two opposite features of the square is a triangular number, and a coloring of the whole square combines two of these colorings of pairs of opposite features.
When pairs with both objects the same are excluded, a different sequence arises, the tritriangular numbers  which are given by the formula .

In numerology
Some numerologists and biblical studies scholars consider it significant that 666, the number of the beast, is a doubly triangular number.

References

Factorial and binomial topics
Integer sequences